Beautiful Burnout may refer to:
 Beautiful Burnout (TV series), a British television programme
 a track on Oblivion with Bells
 Beautiful Burnout, a play by Bryony Lavery produced by Frantic Assembly and the National Theatre of Scotland.